The two-man bobsleigh results at the 1948 Winter Olympics in St. Moritz. The competition was held on Friday, January 30, 1948 and on Saturday, January 31, 1948.

Medal table

Results

References

External links
1948 bobsleigh two-man results

Bobsleigh at the 1948 Winter Olympics